Autumn Sun is a 1996 Argentine drama film directed by Eduardo Mignogna and starring Norma Aleandro and Federico Luppi. It was written by Mignogna and Santiago Carlos Oves. Lita Stantic was the executive producer.

In a survey of the 100 greatest films of Argentine cinema carried out by the Museo del Cine Pablo Ducrós Hicken in 2000, the film reached the 20th position.

Plot
Clara Goldstein (Norma Aleandro) is a Jewish woman who places a personal ad in the Buenos Aires newspaper requesting the company of an older Jewish man. Her sole respondent, Raul Ferraro (Federico Luppi) turns out to be a Gentile from Uruguay. Clara at first spurns him, but soon she realizes she needs him: Her brother is coming to visit her from Boston, and she has been lying to him about being in a romantic relationship. Raul goes along with the ruse. Not long after, the couple begin to fall in love.

Cast
 Norma Aleandro as Clara Goldstein
 Federico Luppi as Raul Ferraro
 Jorge Luz as Palomino
 Cecilia Rossetto as Leticia
 Roberto Carnaghi as Cohen
 Erasmo Olivera as Nelson
 Nicolás Goldschmidt as Wilson
 Gabriela Acher as Silvia

Reception
Critic Russell Smith lauded the film and especially the acting wrote, "Not only do Luppi (Men with Guns, Cronos) and Aleandro present images of mature ardor that compare favorably with the late-career work of Mastroianni and Loren, they also impressively overcome certain Hollywood-like contrivances of plot and dialogue the latter two actors seldom had to contend with. It's a tribute to these stars that, even given the trite situation of the love-shy odd couple gradually facing the inevitable, every halting step they take toward each other feels like a mini-triumph of love's power over the schoolmarmish intellect. They portray with touching specificity what it's like to crave total surrender to love even after long years of experience have proven the foolhardiness of such blind leaps. Not even the blatantly market-tested ending (a malady that seems to be spreading worldwide like Hong Kong flu) detracts from the pleasure of this admirable, eminently watchable date flick. Well worth the price of admission, whether or not you qualify for the senior discount."

It was the most popular Argentinian film for the first nine months of the year with 270,000 admissions.

Awards

Wins
 San Sebastián International Film Festival: OCIC Award, Eduardo Mignogna; Silver Seashell Best Actress, Norma Aleandro; 1996.
 Argentine Film Critics Association Awards: Silver Condor; Best Actor, Federico Luppi; Best Actress, Norma Aleandro; Best Cinematography, Marcelo Camorino; Best Director, Eduardo Mignogna; Best Film; 2007.
 Goya Awards: Goya; Best Spanish Language Foreign Film, Argentina; 1997.
 Oslo Films from the South Festival: Honorable Mention, Eduardo Mignogna; 1997.

Nominations
 Argentine Film Critics Association Awards:  Best Music, Edgardo Rudnitzky; Best Screenplay, Original), Eduardo Mignogna and Santiago Carlos Oves; Best Supporting Actress, Gabriela Acher; 2007.
 San Sebastián International Film Festival: Golden Seashell, Eduardo Mignogna; 2006.

References

External links
 
 Sol de otoño at cinenacional.com 
 

1996 films
1996 romantic drama films
Argentine independent films
Interfaith romance films
1990s Spanish-language films
Argentine romantic drama films
1996 independent films